Viktor Stepanovich Lensky (23 February 1913 – 7 March 1998) was a soviet and Russian  scientist who worked in the field of continuum mechanics.

Biography 

In 1930 he graduated from a nine-year school, then worked as a laborer. In 1935 he was transferred to the Department of Elasticity theory of the mechanical and mathematical faculty of Moscow State University named after Mikhail Lomonosov.

Participant of Eastern Front (World War II) (1942—1945, radio operator and scout). He was awarded the Order of the Patriotic War, Order of the Red Star, two Medals "For Courage", Medal "For the Victory over Germany in the Great Patriotic War 1941–1945" and Medal "For the Capture of Königsberg".

Doctor of Philosophy in the field of Physics and Mathematics for "On one-dimensional longitudinal elastic fluctuations of support." (1947)

Doctor of Sciences in the field of Physics and Mathematics for "Research of the plasticity of metals in complex load." (1961)

Professor of the Department of elasticity theory of Moscow State University (1963).  (1974).  (1997).

Scientific

The field of scientific interests: dynamics of elastic bodies, plasticity.

References 

1913 births
1998 deaths
Moscow State University alumni
Academic staff of Moscow State University
Soviet mechanical engineers
Recipients of the Medal "For Courage" (Russia)
Recipients of the Order of the Red Star
People from Penza Governorate